A fleet solid support ship is a type of Royal Fleet Auxiliary (RFA) ship designed to supply solids (otherwise known as dry stores), such as ammunition, explosives and food, to Royal Navy ships at sea. The term can also refer to the programme to replace the RFA's existing solid support ships, the Fleet Solid Support Ship Programme.

Current ships

As of 2021, the former s ( and ) have been retired and only Fort Victoria has undergone refit to enable her to supply the Royal Navy's new s with solid stores. With incompatible rigs, Fort Rosalie and Fort Austin were placed in extended readiness and were later sold to Egypt. A programme to replace these ships, named the Military Afloat Reach and Sustainability (MARS) Fleet Solid Support (FSS), commenced in 2017, but was delayed in 2019. In May 2021, the competition was restarted with the aim of selecting a design within two years.

Future ships

With the introduction of the Queen Elizabeth-class aircraft carriers, a new class of solid support ship will be required to replace the existing ageing and incompatible Fort class. The Strategic Defence and Security Review 2015 confirmed that three new large solid support ships would be acquired for the RFA as part of the Military Afloat Reach and Sustainability (MARS) Fleet Solid Support (FSS) programme. Rear Admiral Paul Marshall was appointed its Senior Responsible Officer in February 2019.

The National Shipbuilding Strategy (NSS) released in September 2017 stipulated that the design and construction of these ships would be subject to an international competition pitting UK firms against those overseas in order to encourage competitiveness. Classified as "non-warships", the vessels were required to be tendered internationally as per Article 346 of the Treaty on the Functioning of the European Union (TFEU). This received opposition from political parties, including Labour and the Scottish National Party, as well as trade unions, such as GMB and the Confederation of Shipbuilding and Engineering Unions, who criticized the potential loss of work for British shipyards. They recommended that the ships be reclassified as "warships" and therefore exempt from the treaty, allowing them to be built in British shipyards. Sir John Parker, whose recommendations formed the basis for the National Shipbuilding Strategy, also criticized the government's approach as "not the right strategic approach" and recommended that "UK-only competition should be considered for future defence-funded vessels". 

In 2018, a contract notice was placed for two solid support ships, with a probable option of a third later. A list of bidders was subsequently selected with a British consortium consisting of Babcock, BAE Systems, Cammell Laird and Rolls-Royce, as well as international bidders consisting of Fincantieri (Italy), Navantia (Spain), Japan Marine United Corporation (Japan) and Daewoo Shipbuilding and Marine Engineering (DSME) (South Korea). Fincantieri and DSME later withdrew from the bid, however Fincantieri later rejoined.

On 5 November 2019, the competition was suspended to ensure "requirements could be met" and a "value for money solution found", which raised hope from trade unions that the competition could be restarted and involve only UK shipyards.

On 21 September 2020, Defence Secretary Ben Wallace stated the vessels were "warships", effectively confirming they would be built in the United Kingdom. On 21 October 2020, it was announced that the competition for the FSS will be re-started in Spring 2021, covering three ships and it will be an international competition but the team must be a led by a British company. In May 2021 the competition to build the ships was relaunched with the aim of taking a decision within two years. In July 2022, Rear-Admiral Paul Marshall, the Senior Responsible Officer for the Fleet Solid Support ship project, told the House of Commons Select Defence Committee that the first ship was envisaged for service entry in 2028 with the third entering service by 2032. In November 2022 it was announced that Team Resolute (BMT, Harland & Wolff and Navantia) had been selected to build the ships with the start of construction anticipated in 2025.  The manufacturing contract, with a value of 1.6 billion pounds, was signed in January 2023.

The ship hangars will have the capacity to support two Merlin helicopters as well as unmanned aerial vehicles.

See also
  - replenishment tankers which are also part of the Military Afloat Reach and Sustainability (MARS) programme.

References 

Royal Fleet Auxiliary
Ship types
United Kingdom defence procurement